The Bâsca Chiojdului is a right tributary of the river Buzău in Romania. It discharges into the Buzău in Cislău. The following villages are situated along the river Bâsca Chiojdului, from source to mouth: Bâsca Chiojdului, Chiojdu, Lera, Cătina, Calvini.

Tributaries

The following rivers are tributaries to the river Bâsca Chiojdului:

Left: Preseaca, Colnic, Plescioara, Râul Păcurei, Smăciniș, Lera
Right: Bâsca fără Cale, Manole, Căcăcei, Râul Murătoarei, Stâmnic, Zeletin, Frăsinet

References

Rivers of Romania
Rivers of Buzău County
Rivers of Prahova County